The Buenos Aires City Police (In Spanish: Policía de la Ciudad de Buenos Aires) is the police force under the authority of the Autonomous City of Buenos Aires. It started to operate in 2017 following the merger of the Buenos Aires Metropolitan Police and the city's division of the Argentine Federal Police. The force composes over 25,000 officers.

Structure and Organization 
The Buenos Aires City Police is headed by a Chief of Police who is appointed by the head of the executive branch of the City Government and has to be a civilian.

There are four major operational areas:
 Public Security
 Investigations and Research
 Scientific and Technical
 Administration

The force is made up of eleven superintendencies and seven autonomous departments

Geographically, the force is divided between 56 stations. The station employees are all civilians.

Ranks 
The Buenos Aires City Police has eleven ranks, the highest being "Chief Superintendent". The ranking system was inherited from the Metropolitan Police, the Chief Superintendent rank, being a new addition, is used only by the head of the BACP.

 Officer
 First Officer
 Senior Officer
 Inspector
 Chief Inspector
 Deputy Commissioner
 Commissioner
 Senior Commissioner
 Commissioner-General
 Superintendent
 Chief Superintendent of the City Police

Armament and diverse material

This area has a large quantity and variety of weapons.
Pistols Beretta PX4 Storm - Cal. 9x19mm Parabellum.
Pistols Bersa Thunder 9 Pro - Cal. 9x19mm Parabellum.
Pistols SIG Sauer 1911 - Cal. .45 ACP (Used only by tactical group DOEM).
Shotguns Benelli M3 - Cal. 12 gauge.
Submachine gun SIG Sauer MPX - Cal. 9x19mm Parabellum (Used only by tactical group DOEM).
Carbines SIG Sauer SIG516 - Cal. 5,56x45mm (Used only by tactical group DOEM).
Sniper rifles SIG Sauer SIG716 DMR - Cal. 7,62x51mm (Used only by tactical group DOEM).
FN 303 Riot gun.

Vehicles

 Ford Focus EXE 
 Peugeot 408 
 Citroën C4 Lounge
 Chevrolet Meriva 
 Ford Ranger
 Toyota Hilux
 Piaggio MP3
 Honda Deauville NT700

See also 
 Buenos Aires Metropolitan Police
 Argentine Federal Police
 Buenos Aires Province Police
 Interior Security System
 Municipal police

References

External links

 

Law enforcement agencies of Argentina
2017 establishments in Argentina
Buenos Aires